Elmwood Cemetery is a 43-acre historic rural cemetery, located in what is now the urban area of 4900 Truman Road at the corner of Van Brunt Avenue in Kansas City, Missouri. It was formally organized in 1872 and was landscaped by George Kessler.  The first burial was infant Sallie Ayers on July 5, 1872. Features include the public vault and crematorium , entrance gate and fence , Kirkland B. Armour Chapel (1904, 1917), and Cemetery Office (1925). It was added to the National Register of Historic Places in 1983.

The 36,000 plot cemetery is owned, operated, and maintained by the non-profit, Elmwood Cemetery Society.

Notable burials

Kansas City Mayors
 Edward Herrick Allen
 Thomas B. Bullene (1828–1894), mayor and businessman
 James Cowgill
 Webster Davis
 Turner Anderson Gill
 William S. Gregory
 Henry C. Kumpf
 Francis R. Long

Others
 Mary McAfee Atkins, donated money for the Nelson-Atkins Gallery of Art
 Simeon Brooks Armour, meat packing patriarch
 Tom Bass, African American horse trainer 
 William Patterson Borland, Congressman; sculpture by Jorgen Dreyer
 Adolph Bloch, grandfather to H&R Block founders
 James Dallas Bowser, journalist
 Sarah Chandler Coates
 Kersey Coates, real estate developer
 Abram Comingo, Congressman
 William F. "Bill" Davis, Kansas City's first African-American policeman
 Milton Feld, Walt Disney cartoonist
 Hiram Fosdick Dovol, Civil War general
 Thomas Hackney, congressman
 Morris Helzberg, founder of Helzberg Diamonds
 Zeralda James, Jesse James's wife (moved later)
 James Johnson Lindley, Congressman
 Robert Lee, member of the Wild Bunch
 Jacob L. Loose, Hydrox cookie maker
 August Meyer, engineer and parks commissioner
 John William Reid, congressman
 Frank Ringo, baseball player
 James Jordan Squier, capitalist
 William Warner, Congressman
 John W. Wofford (1837–1907), judge and member of the Georgia State Senate and Georgia House of Representatives

References

External links

 Elmwood Historical Society Website
 
 Kansas City Public Library resources

Cemeteries on the National Register of Historic Places in Missouri
1872 establishments in Missouri
Geography of Kansas City, Missouri
Tourist attractions in Kansas City, Missouri
Buildings and structures in Kansas City, Missouri
National Register of Historic Places in Kansas City, Missouri
Rural cemeteries